Yangirabod or Yangirabot ( or) is a city and seat of Xatirchi District in Navoiy Region in Uzbekistan. The town population in 1989 was 11,364 people, and 17,000 in 2016.

References

Populated places in Navoiy Region
Cities in Uzbekistan